Four ships of the United States Navy have been named Canonicus for Canonicus, a chief of the Narragansett Indians, who befriended Roger Williams, and presented him with a large tract of land for the Rhode Island colony. 

 , a monitor in commission from 1864 to 1869 and from 1872 to 1877.
 , a minelayer in commission from 1918 to 1919 which also served as a troop transport
 , a tug in service during World War II.
  Canonicus (ACM-12), a minelayer.

See also
 , a class of nine ships built for the Union Navy during the American Civil War

United States Navy ship names